Schnabelia is a genus of plants in the family Lamiaceae, first described in 1921. The entire genus is endemic to China.

Species
Below are species currently placed in the genus by the World Checklist. Names used by Flora of China are in parentheses.

 Schnabelia aureoglandulosa (Vaniot) P.D.Cantino (= Caryopteris aureoglandulosa (Vaniot) C. Y. Wu) - Guizhou, Hubei, Sichuan, Yunnan
 Schnabelia nepetifolia (Benth.) P.D.Cantino  (= Caryopteris nepetifolia (Benth.) Maxim) - Anhui, Fujian, Jiangsu, Zhejiang
 Schnabelia oligophylla Hand.-Mazz. - Fujian, Guangdong, Guangxi, Hainan, Hunan, Jiangxi, Sichuan, Yunnan
 Schnabelia terniflora (Maxim.) P.D.Cantino  (= Caryopteris terniflora Maxim) - Gansu, Guizhou, Hebei, Henan, Hubei, Jiangxi, Shaanxi, Shanxi, Sichuan, Yunnan
 Schnabelia tetradonta (Y.Z.Sun) C.Y.Wu & C.Chen - Guizhou, Sichuan

References

Lamiaceae
Lamiaceae genera
Endemic flora of China
Taxa named by Heinrich von Handel-Mazzetti